"Without Love (There is Nothing)" is a song written by Danny Small and originally recorded by Clyde McPhatter in 1957. McPhatter's version peaked at number six on the R&B Best Seller chart and number nineteen on Billboard Hot 100.

Cover versions
Throughout the years the song has been recorded by a number of artists:
In 1969, Tom Jones recorded the most successful charting version of the song, and it reached number five on the U.S. Hot 100 and number one on the Easy Listening chart in early 1970. In Canada, the single went to number one on the RPM 100 national Top Singles chart on Valentine's Day (February 14), 1970.  
In 1978, this song was covered by Filipino singer Sam Sorono (1950–2008) on his Sings Tom Jones' Greatest Hits LP album with EMI Records. 
Ray Charles, Elvis Presley, Jay and the Americans, and Oscar Toney have recorded the song.

See also
List of RPM number-one singles of 1970
List of Billboard Easy Listening number ones of 1970

References

1957 songs
1957 singles
1969 singles
Clyde McPhatter songs
Tom Jones (singer) songs
RPM Top Singles number-one singles